Vítor Fernando de Carvalho Campelos (born 11 May 1975) is a Portuguese football manager who manages  Chaves.

Career

Born in Guimarães, Campelos began his career in the staff of José Manuel Gomes at F.C. Paços de Ferreira and Leixões SC. From 2007 to 2013, Campelos worked as an assistant manager to compatriot Toni at Saudi Arabian side Ettifaq FC, Sharjah FC in the United Arab Emirates, Al-Ittihad Club in Saudi Arabia and Tractor S.C. in Iran. In 2013, he was given his first outright managerial job, at the reserve team of Hungary's Fehérvár FC in the country's third division.

On 19 January 2015, Campelos was appointed at C.D. Trofense in his country's Segunda Liga; the team were last after 23 games. In his first game as a professional manager six days later, he lost 2–0 at home to S.L. Benfica B.

After relegation, Campelos moved in June 2015 to his hometown team Vitória S.C. B. He left in May 2018, having kept them in the second tier in each of his three seasons with finishes of 13th, 11th and 11th; He led the first team on an interim basis after the resignation of Pedro Martins, losing 3–2 at C.S. Marítimo in his only game on 24 February 2018.

In May 2019, Campelos was appointed manager of Primeira Liga club Moreirense FC, replacing Ivo Vieira. He left by mutual accord on 16 December.

On 15 January 2020, Campelos returned to the Saudi Professional League with Al Taawoun FC, replacing fellow Portuguese Paulo Sérgio. He lost his job at the end of August, with six consecutive defeats out of a record of three wins in 15.

Campelos went back to Portugal's second tier on 11 February 2021, succeeding Carlos Pinto at fifth-placed G.D. Chaves. In 2021–22, he won the league's Manager of the Month in December, January and April as the team finished third and returned to the top-flight after a three-year absence with a 2–1 aggregate win over his former club Moreirense in the promotion/relegation play-offs.

References

External links
 Vítor Campelos at playmakerstats.com

1975 births
Living people
Sportspeople from Guimarães
Portuguese football managers
Expatriate football managers in Saudi Arabia
Expatriate football managers in Hungary
Portuguese expatriate sportspeople in Saudi Arabia
Portuguese expatriate sportspeople in the United Arab Emirates
Portuguese expatriate sportspeople in Hungary
Primeira Liga managers
Liga Portugal 2 managers
Saudi Professional League managers
C.D. Trofense managers
Moreirense F.C. managers
G.D. Chaves managers
Al-Taawoun FC managers